Classes of Tantra in Tibetan Buddhism refers to the categorization of Buddhist tantric scriptures in Indo-Tibetan Buddhism. Tibetan Buddhism inherited numerous tantras and forms of tantric practice from medieval Indian Buddhist Tantra. There were various ways of categorizing these tantras in India. In Tibet, the Sarma (New Translation) schools categorize tantric scriptures into four classes, while the Nyingma (Ancients) school use six classes of tantra.

Sarma ("New Translation") classification 
The Sarma, "New Translation" schools of Tibetan Buddhism (Gelug, Sakya, Kagyu, Jonang) classify tantric practices and texts into four. In this, they follow Indian Tantric Buddhists such as Abhayākara, who makes this distinction in his Clusters of Quintessential Instructions. Tantras are classified according to the capacity of persons, the deities they use, the specific types of methods they employ and how they use desire (kama).

Kriyā 

Kriyā (Tib. bya ba, Action) tantras were taught for practitioners of lower ability who have an inclination for performing many external ritual activities for protection and purification purposes, such as ritual bathing, the sprinkling of scented water, the creation of a circle of protection, the use of mudras and the chanting of mantras. There are also various prescriptions dealing with eating, drinking, and clothing. According to Kongtrul, in Kriyā Yoga, one relates to the deity as a subject relates to their lord and only meditates on an external deity (not on oneself as being the deity).

According to Kongtrul, "the essence of action tantra" is:

Regarding initiation, The Essence of Pristine Awareness states: "it is widely known that in action tantra there are the water and crown initiations."

Each action tantra text generally centers on a particular Buddha or Bodhisattva, and many are based on dharanis. Some of these texts are actually titled "sutra" or "dharani". Action tantra includes various practices for deities such as Medicine Buddha, "the eleven faced" Chenrezig and Vajrapani. Examples of Action Tantra texts include:

 Mahāmegha Sutra, 
 Sacred Golden Light Sutra, notably a very popular sutra in East Asia
 Dharani of the Eleven-Faced Avalokiteshvara
 Marichi Dharani
 Ārya-mañjushrī-mūla-kalpa, which notably states that mantras taught in the Saiva, Garuda and Vaisnava tantras will be effective if applied by Buddhists since they were all taught originally by Manjushri.
 Subhāhu-pariprcchā (Dialogue with Subahu), 
 Secret General Tantra
 Susidhi Tantra
 Manjushri Root Tantra 
 Supreme Knowledge of Vajrapani Tantra
 Aparimitāyur-jñāna-hrdaya-dhāranī. 
 Heart Sutra (Prajñāpāramitāhṛdaya, which contains a mantra).

Regarding the practice of deity yoga in Action Tantra, Kongtrul outlines six main elements or deities, namely "Emptiness, letter, sound, form, Seal, and sign":

Caryā 

Caryā (spyod pa, Performance, or Conduct) tantras are meant for practitioners of middle ability. According to Tsongkhapa, it is for "those who balance external activities and internal meditative stabilization without relying on very many activities." The kind of desire it uses is the weakest kind, comparable to a couple looking at each other. They are also known as Upa tantra, or Ubhaya tantra.

Although these tantras maintain numerous external ritual actions, the emphasis is now upon obtaining liberation through meditation. It is thus seen as maintaining a balance between inner and outer actions. It is externally similar to Kriyā tantra, and internally similar to Yoga tantra.

According to Kongtrul, the main elements of Conduct tantra are:

Kongtrul further states, "conduct tantra is known to have five initiations: water, diadem, vajra, bell, and name."

In this class of tantras, Vairochana is a principal deity. In Tibetan Buddhism, this tantra class includes practice lineages for the Mahãvairocanãbhisaṃbodhitantra ('Awakening of Great Vairocana'), for the Vajrapãṇyabhiṣekamahãtantra (Vajrapāṇi Initiation Tantra) and for Manjushri.

The presence of Buddha Vairocana is often evident in tantras of this class where he is often depicted in the centre of a mandala with four other Buddhas of his retinue placed to the four quarters, the cardinal directions. Importantly, during the Caryā tantra class and literary period, there developed the salient innovation wherein the sadhaka is to cultivate identification with the deity in meditative absorption (known as "self generation"). This class of literature was also important to Chinese Zhenyan Buddhism and tantric masters such as Śubhakarasiṃha (637-735), Vajrabodhi (671–741) and Amoghavajra (705–774). This focus was later imparted by Amoghavajra's disciple Huiguo (746-805) to the monk Kūkai (774–835), leading to the development of Japanese Shingon Buddhism.

Guarisco & McLeod explain Jamgon Kongtrul's codification of this class as follows:

In Caryā yoga, the yogi visualizes themselves as the 'commitment being' (Sanskrit: samayasattva) and visualizes the 'gnosis being' (jñānasattva), who is envisioned in the relationship of a spiritual friend, in front of them. Various "meditations with signs" are part of this practice including: bija (seed syllable) and mandala visualization, mudra (hand seals), repetition of mantras, etc. as found in Action tantra. Conduct yoga also includes a special "yoga without signs", described by Kongtrul as follows:

Yoga 
Yoga tantra (rnal’byor) is, according to Tsongkhapa, meant for practitioners of high ability who "mainly rely on meditative stabilization and rely on only few external activities." The level of desire they use is said to be similar to a couple holding hands or embracing. "Yoga" refers to the union or yoking of method and wisdom. One sees one's body, speech and mind as inseparably united with those of the deity.

Kongtrul defines Yoga tantra thus:

Yoga tantra is the last and highest of the outer tantras, and here external rites are seen as much less important than internal practices. The empowerments given are the empowerment of the 5 Buddha families, and the empowerment of the Vajra master, and disciples must take on the commitments of the 5 buddha families, and take the tantric vows. The path is split into 4 seals; the great seal of body, the seal of the speech of Dharma, the seal of the mind of commitment, and the seal of enlightened actions.

Some Vajrasattva practices fall under this category, as well as the Tattvasaṃgraha Tantra (Summation of Essential Principles) and the Vajraśekhara Tantra (Indestructible Peak). Other Yoga tantras include the All-Secret Tantra, the Victorious in the Three Worlds Tantra; and the Glorious Supreme Original Being. While Vairochana maintains his position as principal deity, he is now envisaged as being in the center of 5 buddha families instead of 3, each family belonging to one of the Five Tathagathas.

The Shurangama Sutra and the Shurangama Mantra from which it (called the Shitatapatra Ushnisha Dharani) comes can be included in this category.

Unsurpassable Yoga 

Anuttarayoga tantras (rnal ’byor bla med, Unexcelled or Unsurpassable yoga tantras), also known as Yoganiruttaratantra are meant for practitioners of the highest ability who do not rely on external activities. It uses the highest level of desire, sexual union and is thus also designated the “tantra of union of the two.” According to Kongtrul, only Highest Yoga includes both the generation and completion phases. Kongtrul states that these are "supreme among all tantras" and  "there is no other tantra above it."

Anuttarayoga is characterized by the practice of Deity Yoga as well as various subtle body yogas (such as the six Dharmas of Naropa), to generate great bliss and attain the subtle clear light (luminous) mind. According to Miranda Shaw, Anuttarayoga Tantra texts "have remained at the forefront of contemplation, ritual, and interpretation throughout the Himalayan Buddhist sphere".

In the classification of the Dzogchen system, used by the Nyingma, it is considered equivalent to the Mahayoga tantras. The Dalai Lama XIV states: "old translation Dzogchen and new translation anuttarayoga tantra offer equivalent paths that can bring the practitioner to the same resultant state of Buddhahood".

Kongtrul describes the essence of Unsurpassed Yoga Tantra as being

This statement contains various tantric terms express the nature of Unsurpassed Tantra. Bhaga (ultimately) refers to the source of phenomena (chos ’byung, dharmodaya), or source of all awakened qualities, and also literally to the vagina of a female sexual consort (i.e. the queen, btsun mo). Thus this statement refers to karmamudra, sexual union, which is a key element of the symbolism, thought and practice of Unsurpassed Yoga Tantras and which generates a great blissful consciousness (the "castle of great bliss") that is then directed to understanding ultimate reality. Furthermore, when the tantras speak of relying on one's mothers, sisters etc., this refers to different types of tantric consorts. Regarding the six parameters, this refers to "six levels of meaning in the content of the tantras" which express different ways of interpreting and understanding the tantras.

Tantras 
Anuttarayoga tantras which became prominent in Tibet include:

 Cakrasaṃvara Tantra
 Mañjuśrīnāmasaṃgīti (Reciting the names of Manjushri)
 Sampuṭodbhavaḥ (Emergence from Samputa)
 Caṇḍamahā­roṣaṇa Tantra
 Guhyasamāja (Esoteric Community)
 Vajramahābhairava Tantra (Great Vajra Terrifier Tantra)
Hevajra Tantra
 Kṛṣnayamāri Tantra (Black Yamari)
 Raktayamāri Tantra (Red Yamari)
 Mahā­māyā Tantra
 Mahākāla Tantra
Kālacakra Tantra
 Ekajaṭa Tantra

In Sarma, they are sometimes further classified into "Father Tantras" (Wyl. pha rgyud), "Mother Tantras" (ma rgyud) and "Non-Dual Tantras" (gnyis med kyi rgyud).

The mahāyoga-tantras of Pala Empire India became known in Tibet as 'Father Tantras' (pha rgyud). According to the Gelug view, following Tsongkhapa's reasoning, Father Tantras emphasize the creation of a Buddha form through the cultivation of an illusory body, on the basis of practices with the energy system of the subtle body. Earlier Sakya masters and Kagyu scholars had viewed Father Tantras as emphasising the practice of blissful awareness. Father Tantras have also been seen as emphasizing the use of anger (pratigha) as the path of practice, focusing on the emptiness aspect of Buddha nature.

The yoginī-tantras which became known in Tibet as 'Mother Tantras' (ma rgyud) emphasize the development of enlightened awareness (the "mind" of the illusory body) through the cultivation of the fundamental pure mind of all beings, known as 'brilliance' (prabhāsvara) (frequently translated, following the Tibetan, as 'clear light'). They are considered to emphasize the utilization of desire (tṛṣṇā) as the path of practice, focusing on the brilliant (prabhāsvara) aspect of Buddha nature. Among the Mother Tantras, the most prominent is the Cakrasaṃvara. The practice of Vajrayogini evolved out of the Cakrasaṃvara and is now a de facto practice in its own right. Other Mother Tantras are Hevajra Tantra and Caṇḍamahāroṣaṇa.

Non-dual tantras utilize both anger and desire as an antidote to delusion (avidyā), focusing on both the physical and mental, void and brilliant, aspects of enlightened mind. The example typically advanced for this category is the Kālacakra Tantra. The Sakya tradition also considers Hevajra to be a non-dual tantra but other traditions classify it as a yoginī-tantra.

Nyingma classification 
The Nyingma school meanwhile, has six main tantra categories, which make up the last six of the main Nyingma "nine yana" schema. According to Jean-Luc Achard, "in the Nyingma tradition, there are several ways of classifying the teachings of the Buddha into nine, ten, and sometimes twelve Vehicles. Most of these classifications have not survived in practical usage, except for that into nine. In this case, the ninth is considered to be the Vehicle of Dzogchen."

The first three categories are essentially the same as the Sarma classification (Kriyā, Caryā or Ubhaya and Yoga) and are called "Outer Tantras".

The last three are the "Inner Tantras": Mahāyoga, Anuyoga and Atiyoga.

 Mahāyoga (rnal ’byor chen po), is a class of tantric texts and practices that emphasize the stage of generation and are sometimes also termed father tantras. The Net of Magical Manifestation (Māyājāla) collection contains the major Mahayoga works, The Guhyagarbha Tantra is the most influential of these.
 Anuyoga (rjes su rnal ’byor) texts are associated with tantras that emphasize the stage of completion and are associated with mother tantras. They also teach a "principle of instantaneous perfection", which is not found in other tantras. An example of one of these texts is the All-Unifying Pure Presence (Kun ’dus rig pa’i mdo).
 Atiyoga (Dzogchen). In Nyingma, Dzogchen ("Great Perfection") is seen as a non-gradual method which transcends the two stages of tantric yoga and focuses on direct access to the innate purity of things. Atiyoga is further divided into three main categories: Mind Series (semde), Space Series (longdé) and Instruction Series (menngakde). There are numerous tantras and texts associated with this vehicle, such as the Kunjed Gyalpo and the "Seventeen tantras of the esoteric instruction cycle" (man ngag sde'i rgyud bcu bdun).
According to Longchenpa's Great Chariot:

Longchenpa's Finding Comfort and Ease in the Nature of Mind states:

Regarding the alternative schemas which are now rarely used in Nyingma, Achard writes:

See also 
 Buddhist texts
 Tantras (Hinduism)

Notes

References
Mkhas-grub-rje (compiler); Lessing, R.D (senior translator)  & Wayman, Alex (journeyman translator, annotations) (1968, 1993). 'Introduction to The Buddhist Tantric Systems'. Tibetan transliterated in Wylie with English Translation. Second edition. Delhi, India: Motilal Banarsidass. 
Guarisco, Elio  (trans.); McLeod, Ingrid (trans., editor); Jamgon Kongtrul Lodro Taye, Kon-Sprul Blo-Gros-Mtha-Yas (compiler) (2005). The Treasury of Knowledge: Book Six, Part Four: Systems of Buddhist Tantra. Ithaca, New York, USA: Snow Lion Publications. 

Buddhist tantras
Vajrayana
Tibetan Buddhist practices